The 2016–17 Wofford Terriers men's basketball team represented Wofford College during the 2016–17 NCAA Division I men's basketball season. The Terriers, led by 15th-year head coach Mike Young, played their home games at the Benjamin Johnson Arena in Spartanburg, South Carolina as members of the Southern Conference. They finished the season 16–17, 10–8 in SoCon play to finish in a tie for fourth place. They defeated Chattanooga in the quarterfinals of the SoCon tournament to advance to the semifinals where they lost to UNC Greensboro.

This was the final season for Benjamin Johnson Arena as an NCAA sports venue. All of the arena's tenants—Wofford men's and women's basketball, plus women's volleyball—moved to the new Jerry Richardson Indoor Stadium for the 2017–18 school year.

Previous season
The Terriers finished the 2015–16 season 15–17, 11–7 in SoCon play to finish in a tie for third place. They lost in the quarterfinals of the SoCon tournament to Western Carolina.

Roster

Schedule and results

|-
!colspan=9 style=| Non-conference regular season

|-
!colspan=9 style=| SoCon regular season

|-
!colspan=9 style=| SoCon tournament

References 

Wofford Terriers men's basketball seasons
Wofford
Wolf
Wolf